Sundarganj is an upazila of Gaibandha District in the Division of Rangpur, Bangladesh.

Geography
Sundarganj is on the banks of the river Teesta.

Demographics
Sundarganj has a population of 4,61,920 (2011 census). It has 70165 households. Males comprise 2,26,118 of the population, and females 2,35,802. The population density is 572.23. Sundarganj has an average education rate of 78.13%.

Administration
Sundarganj Upazila is divided into Sundarganj Municipality and 15 union parishads: Bamondanga, Belka, Chandipur, Chaporhati, Dohbond, Dhopadanga, Haripur, Konchibari, Kapasia, Ramjibon, Shantiram, Sorbanondo, Sonaroy, Sreepur, and Tarapur. The union parishads are subdivided into 110 mauzas and 189 villages.

Sundarganj Municipality is subdivided into 9 wards and 17 mahallas.

Colleges
 Sundarganj D.W Gov. College (Sundarganj)
 Sundarganj Degree Women's College (Sundarganj)
 Belka Degree College (Belka, Sundarganj) 
 Dharmapur Abdul Jabbar Degree College (Dharmapur, Sundarganj)
 Dharmapur Women's College (Dharmapur, Sundarganj) 
 Dhubni Mohila College (Dhubni, Sundarganj) 
 Shobhaganj Degree College (Shobhaganj, Sundarganj) 
 Shobhaganj Women's Model College (Shobhaganj, Sundarganj)
 Bamandanga Abdul Haque College ( Bamandanga, Sundarganj)
 Dhubni Kanchibari College (Dhubni, Sundarganj) 
 Ramdeb Shaikh Khabir Uddin College (Ramdeb, Sundarganj) 
 Bazarpara College (Bazarpara, Sundarganj)

Health centers 
 Sundarganj Upazila Health Complex (Sundarganj)
 Bamdanga sub-health center (Bamandanga)
 Shobhaganj Sub-Health Center (Chaparhatti)
 Belka Sub-Health Center (Belka)
 Kanchibari Sub-Health Center (Kanchibari)
 Haripur sub-health center (Haripur)
 Chandipur sub-health center (Chandipur)
 Dharmapur Sub-Health Center (Dharmapur)

High schools
 Sundargonj Abdul Majid Gov. Boys High School
 Sundarganj Amina Gov. Girls High School
 Sundarganj Abdul Mazid Mondal High School
 Sibram Alhaj md. Hossain srity school and college
 Shibram School And College
 Teani Moniram High School
 Ramjiban High School
 Bazar Para High School
 Fazlul Haque High School
 Shovagonj High School
 Belka M C High School
 Belka Monika Girls High School
 Mirganj Adarsha High School
 Falgachha High School
 Ramdeb High School
 Khamar Moniram High School
 Khamar Moniram Girls High School
 Kamarpara Girl's High School
 Nazimabad B.L High School
 Dhaniar Kura High School
 Paran Adarsha High School
 Dharmapur D.D.M. High School
 Bamandanga Girls High School
 Sreepur Changmari M.L High School

Notable places
 Bamondanga Zamidar Bari, a palace, was built in 1252 A.D.

See also
Upazilas of Bangladesh
Districts of Bangladesh
Divisions of Bangladesh

References

Upazilas of Gaibandha District